The blackish-headed spinetail (Synallaxis tithys) is a species of bird in the family Furnariidae. It is found in Ecuador and Peru. Its natural habitats are subtropical or tropical dry forests, subtropical or tropical moist lowland forests, and pastureland. It is threatened by habitat loss.

References

External links
BirdLife Species Factsheet.

Synallaxis
Birds described in 1877
Taxa named by Władysław Taczanowski
Birds of Ecuador
Birds of Peru
Taxonomy articles created by Polbot